The 2016 Nagoya Grampus season was Nagoya Grampus' 24th season in the J.League Division 1 and 34th overall in the Japanese top flight. Takafumi Ogura managed the team until 23 August, when he was replaced with Boško Gjurovski. Nagoya Grampus finished the season in 16th place, being relegated to J2 League for the first time in their history, whilst being knocked out of the Emperor's Cup at the Second Round stage by Nagano Parceiro and the failing to progress from their J.League Cup group.

Squad

Transfers

Winter

In:

Out:

Summer

In:

Out:

Competitions

J.League

First stage

Results summary

Results by round

Results

League table

Second stage

Results summary

Results by round

Results

League table

Overall

J.League Cup

Group stage

Emperor's Cup

Squad statistics

Appearances and goals

|-
|colspan="14"|Players who left Nagoya Grampus during the season:
|}

Goal Scorers

Disciplinary record

References

Nagoya Grampus
Nagoya Grampus seasons